Gershon Shaked
(1929–2006) was an Israeli scholar and critic of Hebrew literature.

Biography
Gerhard Mandel (later Gershon Shaked) was born in Vienna, Austria. He immigrated to Mandate Palestine alone in 1939, and was later followed by his parents. He attended Gymnasia Herzliya in Tel Aviv. He hebraicized his surname to "Shaked"(almond). He was married to Malka, and had two daughters.

Shaked's major oeuvre is his Hebrew Narrative Fiction: 1880–1980, a series of five volumes that were published between 1977 and 1998. In these volumes he coined the term "The Zionist super-plot" and offered a broad perspective on the modern Hebrew literary system, its inner logic and development.

Shaked was a member of Israel Academy of Sciences and Humanities, and published about twenty books, hundreds of articles and also autobiographical writing. He studied the works of authors such as Mendele Mocher Sforim, H.N. Bialik, S.Y. Agnon, Amos Oz and A.B. Yehoshua, as well as general currents in modern Hebrew literature – both in retrospect and in real time, as they were evolving.

Academic career
In 1950, Shaked studied at the Hebrew University of Jerusalem, where he earned a doctorate in Hebrew literature in 1964 and later chaired the Department of Hebrew Literature. In addition to his many publications in Hebrew, he also wrote more than thirty books of criticism in other languages.

Awards and recognition
 1987: Bialik Prize for Jewish thought.
 1993: Israel Prize for Hebrew literature.
 2000–2001: Fellow, Katz Center for Advanced Judaic Studies
 2004: Bahat Award for Non-Fiction.

Bibliography (Hebrew) 		
	
 On Four Stories, The Jewish Agency for Israel. The Jewish Agency for Israel, 1963
 Laughter and Tears: Studies in Mendele Mocher Sforimʹs Works. The Hebrew Writers Association, Massada, 1965
 On Three Plays. The Jewish Agency for Israel, 1968
 The Hebrew Historical Drama in the Twentieth Century. Bialik Institute, 1970
 A New Direction in Hebrew Narrative. Sifriat Poalim, 1971
 If You Ever Forget: Essays on American-Jewish Literature. Eked Publishing, 1971

 Dead End : studies in J. H. Brenner, M. J. Berdichevsky, G. Shoffman and U. N. Gnessin. Hakibbutz Hameuchad Publishing House, 1973
 The Narrative Art of S.Y. Agnon. Sifriat Poalim, 1976
 A New Direction in Hebrew Narrative. Sifriat Poalim, 1971 (Extended Edition in 1974)
 Hebrew Narrative Fiction 1880–1980 [5 vols.]. Hakibbutz Hameuchad Publishing House, 1977–1998
  No Other Place (essays). Hakibbutz Hameuchad Publishing House, 1983 (Extended Edition in 1988)
  Wave After Wave in Hebrew Narrative . Keter Publishing, 1985
 Four Chapters in Applied Reception Theory. The Katz Research Institute for Hebrew Literature/ Tel Aviv Univ., 1987
 S.Y. Agnon – A Writer with a Thousand Faces . Hakibbutz Hameuchad Publishing House, 1989
 About Stories and Plays: Elements of Short Stories and Plays. Keter Publishing, 1992
 Literature Then, Here and Now. Zmora-Bitan Publishing, 1993
 Mostly Mendele. The Hebrew Univ., Magnes Press, 2004	
 Identity: Jewish Literatures in European Languages. Haifa Univ. Press, 2006
  Group Portrait: Aspects of Israeli Literature and Culture . Dvir, Heksherim Institute/ Ben-Gurion Univ., 2009

Published works (English)

Literary criticism
 The New Tradition: Essays on Modern Hebrew Literature. Hebrew Union College Press/ Wayne State University Press, 2006
 Modern Hebrew Fiction. Indiana University Press, 2000.* Shmuel Yosef Agnon: A Revolutionary Traditionalist. New York University Press, 1989.
 The Shadows Within: Essays on the Modern Jewish Writers. Jewish Publication Society, 1987.

Edited anthologies
 8 Great Hebrew Short Novels. Toby Press, 2005
 Six Israeli Novellas, David R. Godine, 2002

See also 
 List of Israel Prize recipients
 List of Bialik Prize recipients

References

External links 
 An Unhearalded Zionist – Article on Shaked from Commentary Magazine.

1929 births
2006 deaths
Israeli literary critics
Israel Prize in literature recipients
Members of the Israel Academy of Sciences and Humanities
Herzliya Hebrew Gymnasium alumni
Jewish emigrants from Austria to Mandatory Palestine after the Anschluss
Members of the European Academy of Sciences and Arts